The German Space Travel Exhibition is a permanent exhibition in the village Morgenröthe-Rautenkranz, Germany. The exhibition is dedicated to Spaceflight and Space exploration.

History 
The first German astronaut, Sigmund Jähn, was born in Morgenröthe-Rautenkranz. Today the village is part of the municipality of Muldenhammer, in the rural district Vogtlandkreis. On the occasion of his space flight in 1978 as part of the Interkosmos program, a permanent exhibition was opened in 1979 in the village. The original title of the exhibition was Permanent exhibition of the first joint cosmos flight USSR – GDR. 
After the German reunification in 1990 this exposition was transformed into an all-German space exhibition. 
In 2006/2007, the exhibition was given a new building with significantly more exhibition space and an attractive outdoor area including a "planetary park" and a space travel themed playground.
The former railway building in which the exhibition was previously housed still exists. Today it serves as a guesthouse and bistro, with decor inspired by space travel and steampunk. In 2020 the street in which the exhibition is located was renamed from "Bahnhofstraße" to "Dr.-Sigmund-Jähn-Straße". A further expansion with a second building is planned for the future. The responsible ministry estimates an investment volume of 3.2 million euros for the project. Construction is not expected to start before the beginning of 2022. 
The exhibition, which is operated by a non-profit Registered association, is visited by 60,000 t0 70,000 guests every year.

Collection 
The exhibition concept, which was developed in close cooperation with representatives of the German Aerospace Center and the German Museum Munich, includes four main themes:

 Insights into the history of Spaceflight and Space exploration
 Presentation of the benefits of space travel for the Earth
 Information about space projects in which Germany is involved
 Appreciation of the achievements of German researchers, engineers, scientists, cosmonauts and astronauts

Important Exhibits 

 Accessible base block of the Soviet MIR space station
 Original – spacesuits
 Original engine of a V2 rocket
 Models of many carrier systems (rockets / Shuttle) on a scale of 1:25
 Engineering model AZUR – first German satellite
 Original experiments from the space stations Salyut, MIR and ISS
 Coupling simulator Soyuz  spaceship  / ISS
 Airplane MiG-21F-13
 In addition to the permanent exhibition, there are 1–2 special exhibitions a year.

Operating association 
The registered association Space Travel Exhibition Association has over 250 national and international members. Almost all German astronauts and cosmonauts are association members.
The association designs and operates the exhibition and also organizes various symposia and events. A highlight event is the space travel days with astronauts and cosmonauts, technicians and scientists as well as space travel fans and technically interested people.

References

External links 
 Homepage German 
 Homepage Englisch

Museums in Saxony
Transport museums in Germany
Vogtland
Museums established in 1979
Science museums in Germany
Aerospace museums in Germany